Brezovica ski resort or Brezovica ski center, is a mountain resort and the largest center of winter tourism in Kosovo. Located on the slopes of Sharr Mountains, it is mainly a destination for skiing and snowboarding. In the summer, eco-tourism opportunities include hiking, mountain biking, golf, and other outdoor recreational activities. Hiking paths can lead the visitors to the nearby Livadh Lake.

History
Brezovica ski resort was established in 1954. The ski resort area is ideally situated on the north and northwest-facing slopes of the Sharr Mountains National Park. The first of five ski lifts to the resort was installed in 1979. The resort features 16 kilometers of ski slopes located on the north and northeast facing slopes of the Sharr Mountains. The resort was host to a number of international skiing events in the 1980s and 1990s but has since been developed for tourism.

Although Brezovica served as an alternative site for downhill skiing events of the 1984 Sarajevo Winter Olympic Games and hosted a number of International Ski Federation events in the 1980s and 1990s, the resort has not received significant infrastructure investments for more than two decades.

The legal status of Brezovica ski resort was disputed since the 1999 Kosovo War, as both the Government of Serbia and Government of Kosovo claim that they have property rights over it. This resulted in lack of investments for more than two decades.

In November 2014, the government of Kosovo signed a 410 million euros contract with French consortium led by Compagnie des Alpes, to develop Brezovica ski resort over next two decades. However, in June 2016, the contract was cancelled as the French consortium couldn't provide bank guaranties for the investments.

As of 2018, the most of the tourists are coming from Kosovo and neighboring Albania.

Gallery

Features

The ridge line spans 39,000 hectares of high alpine mountain terrain and forests, with a highly diverse and abundant flora and fauna. Located within 90 minutes of two international airports (Pristina International Airport Adem Jashari and Skopje International Airport), the Brezovica resort area represents one of the last remaining under-developed ski resort areas in Southeast Europe. The station of the outline with the exit from the cable car, is at a height of 2,212 meters above sea level. Ski center Brezovica is open for skiing during the seasons, where in summer its surface is covered with snow, with a low exploitation possibility. Three new lifts opened in 2008. On Brezovica FIS slopes for slalom, giant slalom, downhill race and "Super G" simultaneously could ski 50,000 skiers.

A number of successful national and international competitions are held at the resort, including the Belgrade-owned "Inex ski center Brezovica", among others. A number of Kosovo winter sport teams train at the resort. A major investment from MDP Consulting Compagnie des Alpes is expected to have a significant impact in the area concerning environmental issues.

Wide ski terrains of the Brezovica ski resort are made of a system that includes: 5 chair lifts and 5 ski lifts, connected with 16 km of ski slopes of the average length 3,000 meters. On Brezovica FIS slopes for slalom, giant slalom, downhill race and “Super G” simultaneously could ski 50,000 skiers.

The ski slopes have an average length of 4 kilometers and an average of 128 skiable days per year.

The ski centre has around 700 beds in four hotels, while additional accommodation possibilities exist in independent hotels and private facilities. However, these hotels are either operating minimally or are closed due to legal disputes between Government of Serbia and Government of Kosovo. Hotel clients have free transportation and free access to ski lifts. The construction of private houses is booming in the area despite it being a natural park.

See also
 Tourism in Kosovo
 Tourism in Serbia

References

External links

 
 Ski resort Brezovica at skiresort.info

Šar Mountains
Tourism in Kosovo